Emmanuel Addoquaye Lomotey (born 19 December 1997) is a Ghanaian professional footballer who plays as a midfielder for Allsvenskan club Malmö FF.

Club career

Dreams FC 
Lomotey was born in Accra, Ghana. He finished his formation with Dreams FC. He made his professional – and Ghana Premier League – debut on 21 February 2016, starting in a 1–0 away win against Cape Coast Ebusua Dwarfs.

Lomotey scored his first professional goal on 12 March 2016, netting the opener in a 1–1 home draw against Wa All Stars FC. He suffered relegation in his first season, but achieved immediate promotion from Ghana Division One in his second by contributing with ten goals in 24 appearances.

Extremadura UD 
On 30 August 2017, Lomotey moved abroad after agreeing to a one-year loan deal with Segunda División B side Extremadura UD. Initially assigned to the reserves in Tercera División, he started to feature regularly for the first team from March 2018.

On 30 June 2018, Córdoba CF announced that Lomotey signed a three-year contract with the club, being initially assigned to the B-side also in the third division. On 18 July, however, he was bought outright by Extremadura and was immediately loaned to Villarreal CF with a buyout clause.

Amiens SC 
In August 2020, Emmanuel moved to Amiens SC in Ligue 2 on a four-year deal.

Malmö FF 
In August 2022, Emmanuel moved to Malmö FF.

International career
On 25 May 2017, Lomotey made his international debut for Ghana, after coming on as a second-half substitute for Gideon Waja in a 1–1 non-FIFA friendly home draw against Benin.

References

External links

1997 births
Living people
Footballers from Accra
Ghanaian footballers
Association football midfielders
Ghana Premier League players
Segunda División B players
Tercera División players
Extremadura UD B players
Extremadura UD footballers
Villarreal CF B players
Ligue 2 players
Amiens SC players
Malmö FF players
Ghana international footballers
Ghanaian expatriate footballers
Ghanaian expatriate sportspeople in Spain
Ghanaian expatriate sportspeople in France
Ghanaian expatriate sportspeople in Sweden
Expatriate footballers in Spain
Expatriate footballers in France
Expatriate footballers in Sweden